Yord-e Anjir (also Romanized as Yord-e Anjīr; also known as Yowrd-e Anjīr and Yūrd-e Anjīr) is a village in Balesh Rural District, in the Central District of Darab County, Fars Province, Iran. At the 2006 census, its population was 353, in 77 families.

References 

Populated places in Darab County